C9, C09 or C-9 may refer to:

Biology, medicine, and chemistry
 C9 (Complement component 9), a protein
 ATC code C09, a subgroup of the Anatomical Therapeutic Chemical Classification System
 C09, ICD-10 code for malignant neoplasm of tonsil
 Carbon-9 (C-9 or 9C), an isotope of carbon

Military and weapons
 Hi-Point Models C9 and C9 Comp handguns
 C9 LMG, Canadian light machine gun
 C9, an ID for the German Nachtjagdgeschwader 5 air squadron in World War II

Music
 C9, a note five octaves above Middle C
 C9, a C ninth chord

Organizations
 Cloud9, an American esports organization
 C9 League, an association of Chinese universities
 The Council of Cardinal Advisers, an advisory body to the pope, originally comprising nine members
C9 Entertainment, a South Korean entertainment company and record label

Transportation
 Cierva C.9, a 1927 British experimental autogyro 
 HMS C9, a British submarine
 Ford C-9, a US military designation for the Ford Trimotor aircraft
 McDonnell Douglas C-9, a US Air Force transport aircraft based on the civilian DC-9
 USS Montgomery (C-9), a US Navy cruiser
 C9, the IATA code for Cirrus Airlines
 Sauber C9, a Le Mans racing car
 C9 engine, by Caterpillar Inc.
 C-9 (Cercanías Madrid), a commuter rail line in Madrid
 LNER Class C9, a class of 2 British steam locomotives rebuilt from C7s in 1931

Other uses
 C9, an ISO 216 standard paper size
 C9, a holiday light bulb size
 C9, a sportswear line by Champion

See also
 9C (disambiguation)